Zeligman is a surname of Polish Jewish origin. Notable people with this surname include:

Shalom Zeligman, an Israeli bridge player (see World Senior Teams Championship and Bermuda Bowl)
Józef Zeligman, a Polish Jew who founded a multicultural high school in  Białystok, Poland

References

Jewish surnames
Polish-language surnames